Satyapriya Tirtha (c. 1701 – c. 1744) was an Indian Hindu  philosopher, guru, scholar, yogi, mystic and the pontiff of Uttaradi Math, a math dedicated to Dvaita philosophy. He was the successor of Satyavijaya Tirtha and the 24th pontiff of Uttaradi Math from 1737—1744.

Biography
Most of the information about Satyapriya Tirtha's life is derived from the hagiography, Guruvamsakathakalpataru authored by Bhimadaivajna of Bijapur. Satyapriya was born with a Sesha- amsa. Satyapriya Tirtha was born as Garlapad Ramacharya in 1701 in Raichur. Satyapriya Tirtha was initially given ashrama by Satyapurna Tirtha. When Sri Satyapurna Tirtha fell ill, and Sri Satyapriya Tirtha was on tour to propagation of Dvaita Philosophy, he ordained sanyasa to Satya Vijaya Tirtha. After 11 years reign as peetadhipathi of the Pontificate he made over the Samsthana to Satyapriya Tirtha. From that time onwards Satyapriya Tirtha began to call Arani by the name Satyavijayanagaram. Satyapriya Tirtha served the pontificate for seven years. He died in 1744 and his mortal remains are enshrined in a mutt in Manamadurai. Satyapriya Tirtha was succeeded by Satyabodha Tirtha

Works
Satyapriya Tirtha composed six major works, most of them are commentaries on the works of Madhva, Jayatirtha and Vyasatirtha and a praise poem.

Mahābhāṣya Vivarana, a commentary on Mahābhāṣya of Patanjali
Māṇḍūkya Upaniṣadbhāṣya, a commentary on Mandukya Upanishad 
Muṇḍaka Upaniṣadbhāṣya, a commentary on Mundaka Upanishad 
Tatvaprakashika Vivruthi, a commentary on Tattvaprakāśikā of Jayatirtha
Chandrika Bindu, a commentary on Tätparya Chandrika of Vyasatirtha
Sri Jayatirtha Stuti, a praise-poem on Jayatirtha

References

Bibliography

External links

1744 deaths
Madhva religious leaders
Dvaita Vedanta
Dvaitin philosophers
Uttaradi Math
Scholars from Karnataka
History of Karnataka
People from Raichur district
People from Raichur